KSNV (channel 3) is a television station in Las Vegas, Nevada, United States, affiliated with NBC. It is owned by Sinclair Broadcast Group alongside dual CW/MyNetworkTV affiliate KVCW (channel 33). Both stations share studios on Foremaster Lane in Las Vegas (making them the only major television stations whose operations are based inside the city limits), while KSNV's transmitter is located on Black Mountain, near Henderson (southwest of I-515/US 93/US 95).

History

Early years
The station was founded on March 8, 1982, with grant of a construction permit issued by the Federal Communications Commission (FCC) to build a new full-power television station on UHF channel 21 to serve Las Vegas. The original owner Frank Scott, an early independent casino pioneer in Las Vegas, named his company Dres Media Inc., and chose KRLR, which contained the first letter of each of his three children's names, for the station's call letters in December 1982. In August 1984, after a couple of extensions to the original construction permit, the station applied for its license to cover construction and went on the air under a Program Test Authority. KRLR was an independent station branding itself as Vusic 21, and at first, aired only music videos. In addition to its over-the-air broadcast on channel 21, the station was carried by Prime Cable on channel 2. The first music video aired on the station, was "Video Killed the Radio Star".

In mid-1985, KRLR began to introduce a few classic television programs, and also began airing World Class Championship Wrestling, a popular one-hour professional wrestling program originating from Dallas, Texas. KRLR was given an FCC license on April 11, 1986. By 1987, the station had replaced the music videos with more conventional fare, such as sitcoms, dramas, movies, and sports. KRLR was best known for being the broadcast home of UNLV Runnin' Rebels and Los Angeles Lakers basketball, as well as San Diego Padres and Oakland A's Major League Baseball. KRLR received competition from movie-intensive KBLR (channel 39, now a Telemundo O&O) and family-oriented independent KFBT (channel 33, now KVCW) in 1989, but held their own to be the number two independent station in Las Vegas (counting Fox-affiliated KVVU-TV, which was still programmed like an independent during its early Fox years).

In May 1994, Dres Media sold the station to Channel 21, LP, a subsidiary of Los Angeles-based Lambert Broadcasting, for $2.85 million. On January 16, 1995, the station became an affiliate of the new United Paramount Network (UPN), and changed its call letters to KUPN to reflect the new affiliation. One of the most successful turnaround stories in broadcasting, Lambert sold the station just two years later to the Sinclair Broadcast Group in April 1997 for $87 million. On March 1, 1998, Sinclair changed the station's affiliation to The WB and on May 27, 1998, changed the station's call letters to KVWB, again in honor of its new affiliation. The station moved to channel 12 on the local cable provider in 1999, when Cox Communications acquired Prime Cable.

On January 24, 2006, CBS Corporation (the parent company of UPN) and the Warner Bros. unit of Time Warner announced that The WB and UPN would be shut down that September and have their higher-rated programs merged onto a new jointly owned network called The CW. On February 22, News Corporation announced that it would start up another new network called MyNetworkTV. This new service, which would be a sister network to Fox, would be operated by Fox Television Stations and its syndication division, Twentieth Television. MyNetworkTV was created in order to give stations affiliated with UPN and The WB that were not mentioned as becoming CW affiliates another option besides becoming independent stations, as well as to compete against The CW. Sinclair chose to put The CW on the company's other Las Vegas area station, the then-independent KFBT, and chose to acquire the MyNetworkTV affiliation for KVWB. In June 2006, anticipating the start of MyNetworkTV, Sinclair changed the station's call letters yet again to KVMY.

On May 15, 2012, Sinclair and Fox agreed to a five-year affiliation agreement extension for the station group's 19 Fox-affiliated stations until 2017. This included an option, that was exercisable between July 1, 2012 and March 31, 2013, for Fox parent News Corporation to buy a combination of six Sinclair-owned stations (two CW/MyNetworkTV duopolies and two standalone MyNetworkTV affiliates) in three out of four markets; KVMY and KVCW were included in the Fox purchase option, along with stations in Cincinnati (WSTR-TV), Raleigh (WLFL/WRDC) and Norfolk (WTVZ). In January 2013, Fox announced that it will not exercise its option to buy any of the Sinclair stations in the four markets included in the option.

2014 license swap
On September 3, 2014, Sinclair announced the purchase of NBC affiliate KSNV-DT (channel 3) from Intermountain West Communications Company for $120 million. As Sinclair already owned KVMY and KVCW, the company was required to sell the license assets (though not the programming) of one of the three stations to comply with FCC ownership restrictions, with the divested station's programming being relocated to the other stations. On November 1, 2014, KVMY's digital subchannel affiliations were swapped with KSNV—moving Cozi TV and Antenna TV to KSNV in exchange for Estrella TV and GetTV. MyNetworkTV programming was moved to KVCW's second digital subchannel, and was replaced by a simulcast of KSNV's NBC programming. On November 4, the two stations also switched callsigns, with KVMY being renamed to KSNV, and KSNV-DT taking on the former KVMY callsign. In January 2015, KVMY stopped simulcasting NBC programming from KSNV, solely carrying Antenna TV and Cozi TV. On January 28, 2015, Intermountain West Communications filed to sell KVMY to Howard Stirk Holdings (a company controlled by Armstrong Williams). HSH had agreed on January 14 to purchase for $150,000 the stock of the Sinclair subsidiary that was a party to IWCC's sale of KSNV-DT and currently holds the license of KVCW; KVCW and KSNV themselves remain under Sinclair ownership. The transaction was finalized on October 30. This transaction was necessary because Las Vegas has only seven full-power stations—not enough to legally permit a duopoly under then-policy.

Three years later, KSNV, owing to its NHL on NBC broadcast commitments, became the local team broadcaster for the Vegas Golden Knights, airing any nationally televised games featuring the Golden Knights (both regular season and Stanley Cup Playoffs) until the network's contract expiration in 2021. In this capacity it was the local area broadcaster of the team's appearance in the 2018 Stanley Cup Final.

As of 2020, following the arrival to the city of the now-Las Vegas Raiders, it is the local outlet for any Raiders games being broadcast on Sunday Night Football, as well as select Raiders games exclusively on ESPN or NFL Network.

Tom Hawley, KSNV's traffic reporter, died on October 15, 2021, at age 61 of pancreatic cancer.

Local news and programming
KSNV presently broadcasts a total of 42½ hours of locally produced newscasts each week (with 7½ hours each weekday and 2½ hours each on Saturdays and Sundays). The station also produces one local program: the sports highlight program (which airs on Sunday evenings after the 11:00 p.m. newscast at the 11:35 p.m. time slot.). A public affairs discussion program, which aired after the weekday noon newscast, was cancelled in November 2013.

KSNV debuted a 3 p.m. newscast, News 3 Live at 3, on August 19, 2013; to accommodate this newscast, the station dropped Days of Our Lives, which moved to KVCW. On September 16, 2013, KSNV added an hour-long 7 p.m. newscast, after its contract to carry Jeopardy! and Wheel of Fortune expired; both game shows later moved to KLAS-TV. The station also dropped Dr. Phil in September 2014 which later moved to KLAS-TV; its two remaining syndicated programs, Rachael Ray and The Doctors, were to be dropped in the fall of 2015 and replaced with newscasts as well. These changes were part of an increased emphasis on KSNV's news department: under this plan, the station's weekday lineup outside of NBC prime time programming would consist entirely of local newscasts. Due to these changes, anchor lineups would be shuffled. However, with the station's fall 2014 sale to Sinclair, it is probable that these plans might not proceed further.

Access Hollywood was added to the schedule at 7:30 p.m. weeknights in September 2014 after the sale to Sinclair was announced. The discussion program Ralston Reports (6:30–7:00 p.m.) ended on December 12, 2014 and was replaced with an hour-long extension of the 6:00 p.m. newscast along with KRNV-DT on December 15, 2014. On December 29, 2014, Days of our Lives was reinstated on the station at 1:00 p.m. weekdays, after NBC objected to the change made by Jim Rogers. The hour-long 11:00 a.m. newscast and the discussion program What's Your Point? (12:30–1:00 p.m.) hosted by Jeff Gillan ended on December 26, 2014 and was replaced by Rachael Ray and an hour-long extension of the noon newscast on December 29, 2014, leaving KTNV-TV with the market's only hour-long 11:00 a.m. newscast. The hour-long 4:00 p.m. newscast ended on January 2, 2015 (leaving only KLAS-TV with an hour-long 4:00 p.m. newscast) and was replaced by Family Feud on January 5, 2015. The hour-long 3:00 p.m. newscast was not affected by the change and continued to compete with KTNV-TV. While Sinclair would not move the station to an all-news daytime format, as intended by Rogers, the station remained committed to substantial news content. Sinclair was considering to bring back the hour-long 11:00 a.m., 4:00 p.m. and 7:00 p.m. newscasts and What's Your Point? at 12:30 p.m.

The Doctors and Access Hollywood were dropped in September 2016 when they moved to KVCW (the latter now airs on KVCW's second digital subchannel). They were replaced in the schedule by Harry Connick Jr.'s talk show and Entertainment Tonight, only for the first show mentioned in the 2016 replacements to be replaced by reruns of Dateline NBC in September 2018, and only for Dateline NBC reruns to move to KVCW, and be replaced by Tamron Hall one year later.

Also in September 2018, Rachael Ray was dropped which later moved to KVCW, and was replaced by an hour of Who Wants to Be a Millionaire, only for Rachael Ray to be reinstated on the station at 11:00 a.m. weekdays, when Millionaire was cancelled.

Since August 17, 2015, the station relaunched newscasts for sister station KVCW. Wake Up With The CW Las Vegas, aired at 7:00 a.m. as an extension to its morning newscast and The CW Las Vegas News at Ten, aired at 10:00 p.m. Both newscasts competed with KVVU's 7:00 a.m. segment of Fox 5 News This Morning and the 10:00 p.m. airing of Fox 5 News at Ten.

Notable current on-air staff
 Jeff Gillan – political reporter, fill-in anchor and former host of What's Your Point? (2009–present)
 Jim Snyder – anchor (1991–1994 and 1998–present)

Notable former on-air staff
 Terry Care – reporter (now retired)
 Sophia Choi – anchor and reporter (2007–2010); now with WSB-TV
 Reed Cowan – anchor (2012–2022); now with KPIX-TV
 Colin Cowherd – sports anchor and reporter (1988–1996); later with ESPN; now with Fox Sports
 Trace Gallagher – reporter (now with Fox News Channel)
 Steve Handelsman – national political correspondent for NBC News' Washington, D.C. Bureau (1984–2017); now retired
 Mark Hyman – national political commentator for Sinclair Broadcast Group's Behind the Headlines (2014–2018); now retired
 Sue Manteris – anchor and reporter (1989–2011); now retired
 Jessica Moore – anchor and reporter (2010–2016); now with WCBS-TV
 Jon Ralston – host of Ralston Reports (2010–2014); now retired and co-founder of The Nevada Independent (2017–present)
 Rory Reid – Democratic political pundit on What's Your Point?; now President and COO, The Rogers Foundation
 Jim Rogers – station owner and founder of the Intermountain West Communications Company (1979–2014); now deceased
 Jack Williams – anchor; later with WBZ-TV in Boston (retired in 2015)

Technical information

Subchannels
The station's digital signal is multiplexed:

Analog-to-digital conversion
When the FCC released its initial digital channel allocations on April 21, 1997, it had assigned KUPN's digital companion channel to UHF channel 20. The allocations met with considerable resistance from low-power broadcasters who would be displaced by the digital channel allocations, and on February 17, 1998, the FCC issued a revised final DTV allocation table. KUPN's original allocation would have displaced low-power station KKJK-LP (now KHDF-CD) and a co-channel TBN station in Bullhead City, Arizona, so the FCC substituted UHF channel 22. The station, renamed KVWB-DT, was granted a permit to construct its digital facilities on November 24, 2000. Technical difficulties delayed construction of the full-power facilities, requiring extensions of the construction permit, and on November 8, 2002, KVWB was granted Special Temporary Authority (STA) to construct a low-power facility in order to comply with the FCC deadline for commencing digital broadcasting while the full-power facilities were still being built. The station, now known as KVMY-DT, completed construction of its full-power digital facilities in January 2007, but as of April 2007, had not yet been granted a license.

In 2006, the FCC required each station with a digital companion channel to select which station it would continue to use after the end of the transition period. KVMY-DT selected channel 22 as its final digital channel and returned the channel 21 license to the FCC. KVMY continues to use channel 21 as its virtual channel per the ATSC standards for PSIP. Regular programming was dropped on February 18, 2009 and the station participated in the "Analog Nightlight" program for two weeks, explaining how to switch to digital reception.

Translators

KSNV (as KVBC) also previously maintained two full-power satellite stations: KVNV (channel 3) in Ely served as a KVBC satellite from its sign-on in 2001 until it was sold to PMCM TV, LLC in 2008, while KMCC (channel 34) in Laughlin was a KVBC satellite from its sign-on in 2003 until it was sold to Cranston II, LLC in 2005. Additionally, the signal for KVBC was to have been relayed over KBMO-TV (channel 9) in Tonopah, Nevada, but construction of this station was not completed before the FCC construction permit expired in 2002.

See also

References

External links

Antenna TV website

1984 establishments in Nevada
Charge! (TV network) affiliates
Low-power television stations in the United States
Estrella TV affiliates
NBC network affiliates
Sinclair Broadcast Group
Stadium (sports network) affiliates
Television channels and stations established in 1984
SNV